The Jacob Lake Ranger Station is a historic U.S. Forest Service ranger station in the unincorporated community of Jacob Lake, Arizona, United States, that is listed on the National Register of Historic Places (NRHP).

Description

Jacob Lake is at a road junction leading to the North Rim of the Grand Canyon, making the ranger station a major contact point for visitors to Kaibab National Forest until the construction of the nearby Kaibab Plateau Visitor Center. The ranger station comprises a wood-framed cabin and a barn, both adjoining a fenced pasture that surrounds Jacob Lake. The complex was built by the Forest Service in 1910.

The walls are clad with board-and-batten siding, and the roof is covered with wood shakes, the only surviving board-and-batten cabin in Kaibab National Forest. The long elevation faces Jacob Lake with a shed-roofed porch across the entire side, formerly enclosed, but now restored to its original open configuration. The interior has two rooms, a kitchen and a bedroom, entered by individual doors from the porch.

The barn is a -story frame structure with board-and-batten siding on a concrete foundation. The roof slopes saltbox fashion from  stories at the front to one story at the back.

The Jacob Lake Ranger Station was placed on the NRHP on July 13, 1987.

History

In June 2020, the station narrowly escape being destroyed in the Mangum Fire.

See also

 National Register of Historic Places listings in Coconino County, Arizona

References

External links

Buildings and structures in Coconino County, Arizona
United States Forest Service ranger stations
Kaibab National Forest
Government buildings completed in 1910
Park buildings and structures on the National Register of Historic Places in Arizona
National Register of Historic Places in Coconino County, Arizona
1910 establishments in Arizona Territory